Appurv Gupta is an Indian Hinglish stand-up comedian and satirist.

Early life
Gupta was born in Delhi to an engineer father and a homemaker mother. He completed his schooling from a government school and graduated in engineering from Jaypee Institute of Information Technology, Noida. Engineering, as a field of education, did not interest him, but he pursued it to fulfil his parents' wish.

Career
After graduating, Gupta started performing at the Toastmasters Club. He has performed in more than 1000 shows in India and abroad since then, including corporate performances for Airtel, Tanishq, Adobe, Amex and Radio Mirchi, IIT Delhi, IIT Kharagpur, IIT Kanpur and IIT Jodhpur. He has written 3 solo shows Appurview, RelationShip Or RelationShit and Laugh with an Engineer 2.0, which has garnered over 10 million views on social media. His most applauded act is Appurview - Laugh with an Engineer which describes life from the point-of-view of an engineer. Gupta is one of those rare stand-up comedians whose comedy is based on self-deprecating humour as was evident from various ‘baniya’ jokes and none on ‘Sardar’. He has started web series "Mudde Ki baat" which covered topics such as start ups in India, cricket, Bollywood and Chetan Bhagat

Gupta was ranked second in "Top 20 Indian stand-up comedian in 2014" by CNN-IBN, and was shortlisted in the Forbes India 100 Celebrity nominees list of 2015 by Forbes India.

References

External links

 

Indian stand-up comedians
Year of birth missing (living people)
Living people
Jaypee Institute of Information Technology alumni